Pakan is a small town in Pakan District, Sarikei Division, Sarawak, Malaysia. The district population estimates (as of the 2017 census) was 17,600.

Most of its inhabitants are ethnic Iban people (95%+) and a few minority Chinese usually concentrated in its town area. A small minority of Malay work in a government sector, such as teachers, nurses, district officers, and police.

Etymology
The name Pakan was derived from a local fruit resembling durian, named Buah Pakan. It has yellowish skin and flesh. The fruit has since become the symbol of the town with its replica built at the junction of Entabai road.

History
In 1911, a man from Guangdong named Wen Ru Zhu (翁如珠) was the first Chinese to arrive in Sarikei. Four years later in 1915, he together with one of his family member, brought some daily necessities, climbed through the mountains and arrive in Pakan to trade with the Iban people living there for agricultural products. Apart from Iban longhouses and rubber plantations, there were no Chinese houses there. The Iban people welcomed the arrival of Wen as he brought the much needed daily necessities to them. The journey to and from Pakan took about ten days. Wen would build a small hut in Pakan to stay there for some days before going back to Sarikei. Later, he married an Iban woman in Pakan and started a family. Later, more Chinese came here to build shophouses and to trade with Iban people.

In 1937, Penghulu Asun staged a rebellion against the Brooke government in Pakan. In 1957, Min Jin primary school (民进小学) was built. In 1968, there was a flood in Pakan.

Government

Since creation of the Sarikei Division in 1973, the Pakan sub-district was put under the jurisdiction of Julau district. On 1 March 2002, the Pakan sub-district was upgraded into a district.

Geography

Longhouses 
Tr. Rawing, Ulu Marau
Tr. Empati anak idai, Nanga Marau
Tr. Saban Sungai Ipoh, Pakan
Tr. Undi, Sg Pantak (once niang Tr Taling)
Tr. Sedau Ak Empali
Tr. Nyambar, Ulu Kota, Pakan 
Tr. Bujang
 Rumah Jilap Bt6 Jalan Entabai Pakan
Tr. Matu Anak Dingun Bt3 Pakan
Tr. Matthew Nawong, Lubuk Pisang, Sg Genega
Tr. Tukang, Nyalak Atas
Tr. James Anak Jantan, Darau. 
Tr. Andrew Ungon, Darau 
Tr. George anak Chungut, Nanga Nansang
Tr. Ganda anak Saba, Manding, Sungai Lemujan
Tr. Attan anak Ana, Lubok Ubi, Sugai
Tr. Linggang anak Kaya, Merampu
Tr. Liman anak Lawo, Munggu Temedak
Tr. Kalong anak Asa
Tr. Janang anak Silang, Sg.Wong, Wak
Tr. Barang Sg Empang, Pakan
Tr. Empi Tanjung, Pakan
Tr. Ladi Nasau, Pakan
Tr. Empek Nasau, Pakan
Tr. Imban, Genting Kopi Pakan
Tr. Jantan, Genting, Kopi Pakan
Tr. Safri, Tubai Buah, Pakan
Tr. Nyalong Nanga Segera, Pakan
Tr. Gandai,Tubai Buah, Pakan
Tr. Budom, Tubai Buah, Pakan
Tr. Menari, Ng Pedanum
Tr. Ragai Sungai Jaong, Pakan
Tr. Japar Ulu Kemalih, Entabai
Tr. Dinggai Amut Atas ,Pakan

Climate
Pakan has a tropical rainforest climate (Af) with heavy to very heavy rainfall year-round.

Demographics

Ethnicity

In 2010, Pakan town had a total population of 14,570, where there were  14,023 Iban people, 402 Chinese, 80 Malays, and 65 from other ethnic groups.

Places of worship
 St. Francis Assisi Church
 BEM (SIB) Nanga Pakan
 Chapel St Joseph, Ulu Kota
 Mosque (beside Klinik Pakan)
 Surau Zulkarnain, Rumah Julin, Kg Amut (sponsored by Yayasan Amal Malaysia Cawangan Sarawak)

Economy

In 2017, Pakan District had 2,000 hectares of pepper farms with 5,800 farmers working on them.

Transport

Local Bus

Alternate road
New road alternative connecting user from Sibu to go directly to Ulu Budu in Saratok district by passing through Pakan provides a shorter time compared to the existing one which passes through T-junction to Sarikei. What used to be about 3 hours journey from Sibu to Saratok will take only about 2 hours. So users on a long journey to Kuching benefit a lot from this road.

Sibu -> Julau -> Bintangor -> Sarikei -> Pakan -> Wak -> Ulu Budu -> Saratok

Other utilities

Education
Primary schools
 SK Nanga Pakan
 SK Nanga Kara
 SK Sungai Sugai
 SK Nanga Wak
 Sk Nanga Sembawang
 Sk Ulu Manding
 Sk Nanga Pedanum
 Sk Nanga Kota
 Sk Nanga Dayu
 Sk Ulu Entabai
 Sk Ulu Entaih
 Sk Nanga Entaih

Secondary school
 SMK Pakan
 (extra information) SMK Meradong (Bintangor), SMK Bintangor (Bintangor), the nearest school most of the upper six students attended after they finishing their form 5.

Culture and leisure

Cultural

Pesta Pakan (Pakan festival) is a yearly festival held in the town of Pakan since 1988 and usually held around August. It consisted of various activities such as sports, entertainment, culture, and arts and various stalls selling food such as Smoke house (Ruman Asap) and drinks.

Historical
 Lumbung Rentap at Bukit Sibau (Rentap's final resting place)
 Bukit Uyu (the grave of the Rentap's follower, Uyu, Medan and two more)

Leisure and conservation areas
 Kerangan Rantau Enjin, Nanga Kelau
 Wong Kuji waterfall
 Kembara Off-Road

Notes

External links

References

Pakan District
Towns in Sarawak